Kempegowda Bus Station, also known as Majestic Bus Station, is a main bus station in Bengaluru, India. It is located opposite the KSR Bengaluru. It is bordered by Seshadri Road to the north, Danavanthri Road to the east, Tank Bund Road to the south and Gubbi Thotadappa Road to the west.

This bus station provides connectivity to almost all the areas of Bengaluru. One side of the bus station is used for intra-city buses by the Bengaluru Metropolitan Transport Corporation (BMTC) while the other side is used by out-station buses operated by various state road transport corporations. The KSRTC side of the bus station also houses the Nadaprabhu Kempegowda (Majestic) metro station on the Namma Metro.

Former chief minister of Karnataka R. Gundu Rao is credited with building the station. The bus station not only eased congestion with buses and helped streamline the transport system but also helped the local area grow economically and was a major landmark of the city for many years.

Name

The station acquired the name Majestic Bus Station or "Majestic" from a popular cinema theatre of the same name located nearby. It was later named as Kempegowda Bus Station in honour of Kempe Gowda I, the founder of Bangalore. However, Majestic continues to be the most commonly used name for the station. Buses terminating at the station usually display signs that show "Kempegowda Bus Station" or "KBS".

History
The bus station started construction in 1965 and opened in 1969. The semi-circular city bus terminal was built in 1980s. The station is located on the site of the Dharmambudhi Lake, which dried up in the early 20th century.

Location in context

See also
 Mysuru Road Bus Station
 Shantinagar Bus Station

References

Bus stations in Karnataka
Transport in Bangalore
Buildings and structures in Bangalore